The Elliott Hall of Music is a theater located on the campus of Purdue University in West Lafayette, Indiana. With a seating capacity of 6,005, it is one of the largest proscenium theaters in the world, and is 45 seats larger than Radio City Music Hall. The facility is named after Edward C. Elliott (1874–1960), who served as President of Purdue University from 1922 to 1945. The stage of the hall is one of the largest in the country. It is roughly the same size as the stage of the Dolby Theatre in Hollywood, California.

The hall was designed by Walter Scholer, assisted by consulting architect J. Andre Fouilhoux (who was also one of the architects for New York's Radio City Music Hall). Construction began in October 1938 and was completed on May 2, 1940, at a cost of US$1.205 million. The facility was dedicated as the "Purdue Hall of Music" on May 3–4, 1940, and was renamed in honor of Elliott in 1958.

The Elliott Hall of Music is connected to Hovde Hall, Purdue University's administration building, by a walkway on the second floor.  This  arrangement allows for the use of the formal entry and receiving hall in the administration building (otherwise not used at nights and weekends when performances are typically held) to serve the Hall of Music, saving both cost and space during the depression era construction.

During spring commencement exercises, students process up the staircase in front of Hovde Hall and go through the walkway into the Hall of Music where the ceremony is held.  For winter commencement exercises, students enter the Hall of Music through the Purdue Bands entrance located behind the stage, where they proceed under the structure and to the rear of the auditorium where they enter, as this entrance is much closer to the building where candidates are marshaled for the procession.

Locally, the building is informally known as Elliott Hall or the Hall of Music. Evening exams for large, multi-section classes (e.g. Introductory Calculus, Principles of Accounting) are often scheduled in Elliott Hall of Music. In a typical exam seating arrangement (every other seat occupied), Elliott can handle about 3000 students during one exam.

Elliott Hall of Music contains the offices of the Purdue All-American Marching Band, Purdue Bands and Orchestras, the WBAA studio, and Hall of Music Productions, the department which provides facility management and box office services for the Hall of Music, as well as production services throughout the Purdue campus.

References

External links
Official website
Hall of Music Productions

Concert halls in Indiana
Theatres in Indiana
Music venues in Indiana
Purdue University buildings
West Lafayette, Indiana
Tourist attractions in Tippecanoe County, Indiana